10 Years or Ten Years may refer to:

Decade, a period of ten years

Film
10 Years (2011 film), a film starring Channing Tatum
Ten Years (2015 film), a Hong Kong film

Music
10 Years (band), an American alternative metal band
10 Years (Armin van Buuren album)
10 Years (Banco de Gaia album)
Ten Years (EP), by Aly & AJ
"10 Years" (song), a song by Daði Freyr and Gagnamagnið, 2021, representing Iceland in the Eurovison Song Contest
Ten Years, an album by Petra Haden and Woody Jackson
"Ten Years", a song by Jack Clement, 1958 
"Ten Years", a song by Buddy Williams, 1960

See also 
Decade (disambiguation)
10 Años (disambiguation)
Ten Years Later (disambiguation)